Toshiaki Imamura (born 11 May 1962) is a Japanese speed skater. He competed in two events at the 1984 Winter Olympics.

References

1962 births
Living people
Japanese male speed skaters
Olympic speed skaters of Japan
Speed skaters at the 1984 Winter Olympics
Sportspeople from Nagano Prefecture
Asian Games medalists in speed skating
Speed skaters at the 1986 Asian Winter Games
Medalists at the 1986 Asian Winter Games
Asian Games silver medalists for Japan